Hildyard is a surname. Notable people with the surname include:

 Sir Christopher Hilliard (1567-1634), also known as Christopher Hildyard, English landowner and politician
 Henry Hildyard
 Henry Hildyard (MP) (1610–1674), MP for Hedon in the 1660 Convention Parliament
 Henry Hildyard (1846–1916), British Army general
 Jack Hildyard (1908–1990), British cinematographer
 James Hildyard (1809–1887), English classical scholar
 Katrine Hildyard, Australian politician
 Lyonel Hildyard (1861–1931), first-class cricket player
 Reginald Hildyard (1876–1965), British Army general
 Robert Hildyard (disambiguation), several people
 Thomas Thoroton-Hildyard (1821–1888), English politician
 Richard, James and Daniel Hildyard (1971 - ), notorious siblings from Beverley, East Yorkshire.